George S. A. Da Costa (1853–1929) was a Nigerian photographer who was active in the late 19th and early 20th centuries. He documented government projects including railway construction in the colony.

Life

George S. A. Da Costa, an Amaro, was born in Lagos in 1853. He was educated at the CMS Grammar School, Lagos.
From 1877 to 1895 he managed the Church Mission Society Bookshop in Lagos.
In 1895 he invested £30.00 in special training and then opened a photography business in Lagos.
He had a thriving business in the 1890s that continued into the next century.

Da Costa worked as a photographer for the colonial government of Nigeria, and took many pictures that recorded government activities throughout the country, including the North.
These included pictures of the construction of the railway from Lagos through Jebba to Kaduna.
His studio in 1920 was at 18 Ricca Street, Lagos.
He worked for Allister Macmillan that year, taking photographs for the Red Book of West Africa.
Macmillan called him "the ablest and best known professional photographer in Nigeria".
52 of his photographs appeared in the Red Book, seven taken in Kano and the others in Lagos.

George Da Costa died in 1929.

Work

Da Costa's work depicts a West Africa that is far from the image of the "dark continent" held by Europeans and Americans at the time. He shows a cosmopolitan society of literati, international merchants, attorneys, politicians, newspaper tycoons and socialites.
Da Costa's photographs appeared in The Red Book of West Africa: Historical and Descriptive, Commercial and Industrial Facts, Figures, & Resources (1920, edited by Allister Macmillan). 
The book claimed it was "the first of its kind ever issued on West Africa, also the most profusely illustrated."
Many of his photographs are reproduced in Christaud M. Geary's In and Out of Focus: Images from Central Africa, 1885-1960 (2003).

References

Sources

1853 births
1929 deaths
Nigerian photographers
19th-century Nigerian businesspeople
Businesspeople from Lagos
20th-century Nigerian businesspeople
CMS Grammar School, Lagos alumni
People from colonial Nigeria